Hawa is a feminine given name.

Etymology
Hawa is the traditional Arabic, classical Hebrew and Swahili name for the Biblical and Qur'anic figure Eve. In Modern Hebrew the more common version is Hava or Chava.

Given name
 Hawa Abdi, Somali doctor and activist
 Hawa Abdi Samatar, former First Lady of Somalia
 Hawa Singh, Indian boxer
 Hawa Khamis, Nguruka Princess

See also
Arabic name
Eve (name)

References

Arabic feminine given names
Bosnian feminine given names